Bennie Reynders (born 16 May 1962) is a South African sprint canoer who competed in the early 1990s. At the 1992 Summer Olympics in Barcelona, he was eliminated in the repechages of the K-2 500 m event and the semifinals of the K-4 1000 m event.

References
Sports-Reference.com profile

1962 births
Canoeists at the 1992 Summer Olympics
Living people
Olympic canoeists of South Africa
South African male canoeists